is the third single by the Japanese girl idol group Shiritsu Ebisu Chugaku (or fourth counting one cover single), released in Japan on April 27, 2011 on the indie label Stardust Digital.

History 
The single achieved the 17th position in the Oricon Daily Singles Chart. In the weekly Oricon ranking, it peaked at number 73.

Members 
Mizuki, Reina Miyazaki, Rika Mayama, Natsu Anno, Ayaka Yasumoto, Aika Hirota, Mirei Hoshina, Rio Koike, Hirono Suzuki, Rina Matsuno, Hinata Kashiwagi

Track listing

Charts

References

External links 
 Releases - The Tissue (Tomaranai Seishun) - Shiritsu Ebisu Chugaku official site
 The Tissue (Tomaranai Seishun) - HMV Online

Shiritsu Ebisu Chugaku songs
2011 singles
Japanese-language songs
Songs written by Kenichi Maeyamada
2011 songs